Andrew Clements (1949–2019), was an American author of children's books.

Andrew Clements may also refer to:

Andy Clements (born 1955), English footballer
Andrew Jackson Clements (1832–1913), American surgeon and politician

See also
Andrew Clemens ( 1857–1894), sand artist